Govind Arun Ahuja (Aka Chichi) (born 21 December 1963) is an Indian former actor, comedian, dancer, and former politician, who has appeared in more than 165  Hindi-language film and established himself one of most popular actors in India. Govinda is known for his slapstick performances and dancing skills. He has received 12 Filmfare Award nominations and won two Filmfare Special Awards and a Filmfare Award for Best Comedian. In June 1999, he was voted the tenth-greatest star of stage or screen in last thousand years by BBC News Online poll.

Starting out as an action and dancing hero in the 1980s,  His first film was 1986's Ilzaam, which was a hit and other  earlier box-office hits include Love 86 (1986), Hatya (1988), Jeete Hain Shaan Se (1988), Do Qaidi (1989), and Hum (1991). However, Govinda would go on to reinvent himself as a comic hero in the 1990s after his role as a mischievous young NCC cadet in the 1992 romance Shola Aur Shabnam and 1993 action comedy  Aankhen in which he played dual role. Following the huge success of these films, Govinda had lead roles in several commercially successful comedy films, including Raja Babu (1994), Coolie No. 1 (1995), Andolan (1995), Hero No. 1 (1997), Deewana Mastana (1997), Dulhe Raja (1998), Bade Miyan Chote Miyan (1998), Anari No.1 (1999) and Jodi No. 1 (2001). He would also receive a Filmfare Award for Best Comedian for Haseena Maan Jayegi (1999) and a Filmfare Special Award for Saajan Chale Sasural (1996).

In the 2000 film Hadh Kar Di Aapne, he played six roles: Raju 
(the main character) and his mother, father, sister, grandmother and grandfather. After a series of several unsuccessful films in the 2000s, his later commercial successes include Bhagam Bhag (2006),  Partner (2007), and Holiday (2014). In 2015, Govinda became a judge on Season 2 of Zee TV's dance-contest program, Dance India Dance Super Moms. The show received the highest TRP of any reality-show opening episode. 

Govinda was a member of the Parliament of India from 2004 to 2009. As part of the Indian National Congress, he was elected the 7th member of parliament for the Mumbai North constituency of Maharashtra, India in the 14th Lok Sabha elections in 2004, defeating Ram Naik of the Bharatiya Janata Party. He is currently working on a famous and popular Bengali show on Zee Bangla Dance Bangla Dance 2021, Season 11 as Judge which started airing on 22 May 2021.

Early life and background 
Govinda was born into a Hindu Khatri family on 21 December 1963 to former actor Aroon (alias Arun Kumar Ahuja) and singer-actress Nirmala Devi.

Govinda's mother hailed from Varanasi, Uttar Pradesh. Aroon came to Mumbai from Gujranwala, Punjab which is now in Punjab, Pakistan, to become an actor in the late 1930s. He is best known for appearing in Mehboob Khan's Aurat (1940). Aroon's professional career as an actor lasted for 15 years, from 1939 to 1954. In these years, he worked as a hero in 30 films. He produced one unsuccessful film which caused financial loss. The family, living in a bungalow on Mumbai's Carter Road, moved to Virar, a northern Mumbai suburb, where Govinda was born. The youngest of 6 children, he was given the pet name "Chi Chi," meaning "little finger" in Punjabi.

Acting career

1986–90: Debut and breakthrough 

After Govinda received a Bachelor of Commerce degree from Vartak College, Vasai, his father suggested a career in films. Around this time, Govinda saw the film Disco Dancer; afterward, he practiced for hours and circulated a promotional VHS cassette. He was offered jobs in a fertilizer commercial and an Allwyn ad.

He was offered the role of Abhimanyu in the popular mythological serial Mahabharat (1988) during its casting and he even had auditioned for it. Still, soon he bagged his first Bollywood film. His first lead role was in Tan-Badan opposite Khushbu, directed by his uncle Anand. Govinda began shooting for his next film, Love 86, in June 1985. His first release was Ilzaam (1986) which was a box office success, soon followed by another hit Love 86 that same year.

He went on to star in many films of various genres between 1987 and 1989 including the family dramas Khudgarz (1987), Dariya Dil (1988), Ghar Ghar Ki Kahani (1988) and action and drama films including Hatya (1988), Marte Dam Tak (1987), Jeete Hain Shaan Se (1988) and Jung Baaz (1989). Govinda worked with David Dhawan for the first time in the 1989 action film Taaqatwar and worked with Rajinikanth and Sridevi in Gair Kanooni that same year.

1990–99: Critical and commercial success 

In 1990, Govinda starred in the cult classic Awaargi, with Anil Kapoor and Meenakshi Sheshadri. Swarg and Maha-Sangram co-starring Vinod Khanna, Aditya Pancholi and Madhuri Dixit were also successful. In 1991, he appeared alongside Amitabh Bachchan and Rajnikanth in the hit film Hum. In 1992 he appeared in Zulm Ki Hukumat, an Indian version of The Godfather, and David Dhawan's Shola Aur Shabnam opposite actress Divya Bharti. His successful collaboration with Dhawan continued with Aankhen, the highest-grossing film of 1993. He and Dhawan would make several successful comedy films which included: Raja Babu (1994), Coolie No. 1 (1995), Saajan Chale Sasural (1996), Banarasi Babu (1997), Deewana Mastana (1997), Hero No. 1 (1997), Bade Miyan Chote Miyan (1998) and Haseena Maan Jaayegi (1999). The actor sang in some of his films: "Meri Pant Bhi Sexy" in Dulaara and "Gori Gori" in Shola Aur Shabnam. Dhawan and other directors frequently cast him with actresses such as Karishma Kapoor, Juhi Chawla and Raveena Tandon during this decade.

2000–05: Slump and break from films 

Govinda's career had a setback during the early 2000s after a series of commercially unsuccessful films. His only major hit film during the early 2000s was Jodi No. 1 (2001). His other films, Hadh Kar Di Aapne, Kyo Kii... Main Jhuth Nahin Bolta and Ek Aur Ek Gyarah were moderately successful. He received nominations for the Filmfare Awards for Best Performance in a Comic Role for Jodi No. 1, Kyo Kii... Main Jhuth Nahin Bolta and Akhiyon Se Goli Maare (2002).

He turned down roles in Taal, Gadar: Ek Prem Katha and Devdas, all of which were highly successful.

Govinda then joined the Indian National Congress. He won a seat in Parliament from Mumbai North by defeating five-time MP Ram Naik, a former Minister of Petroleum and Natural Gas, by over 50,000 votes in the 2004 general election.

The actor took a break from films during the period of 2003 to 2005. He had no new film releases in 2004 and 2005, although some of his delayed films were released during this time, (such as 2005's Khullam Khulla Pyaar Karen and Ssukh— produced by Govinda and directed by his brother, Kirti Kumar and 2006's Sandwich) which were box office failures.

2006–09: Comeback 

Govinda made a comeback to films in late 2006 with the comedy Bhagam Bhag (directed by Priyadarshan), in which he appeared with Akshay Kumar and Lara Dutta. It was Govinda and Kumar's first film together.

His first release of 2007 was director Nikhil Advani's big-budget drama, Salaam-e-Ishq: A Tribute to Love. The all-star cast also included Shannon Esra, Salman Khan, Priyanka Chopra, Anil Kapoor, Juhi Chawla, Akshaye Khanna, Ayesha Takia, John Abraham, Vidya Balan, Sohail Khan and Isha Koppikar. Govinda played Raju, a taxi driver who helps the Caucasian Stephanie (Shannon Esra) who is frantically trying to find her lover. Raju eventually falls in love with her. Although the film was a box office disappointment, Govinda's performance was praised.

His second release that year was a comedy directed by David Dhawan's Partner co-starring Salman Khan, Katrina Kaif and Lara Dutta. The film grossed  in India during its opening week, the second-highest domestic opening-week gross for an Indian film at that time. Govinda won several awards for his performance in Partner including an IIFA Award for Best Comedian and a Zee Cine Award for Best Actor in a Supporting Role – Male. The previously made Jahan Jaaeyega Hamen Paaeyega was directed by his nephew Janmendra alias Dumpy, who was 17 years of age at that time. Jahan Jaaeyega Hamen Paaeyega released in 2007 and did poorly at the box office. The film also introduced two of Govinda's nephews, Krishna Abhishek and Vinay Anand. Govinda also appeared in the song "Deewangi Deewangi", from Om Shanti Om (2007) starring Shahrukh Khan.

In 2008, Govinda appeared in Money Hai Toh Honey Hai, directed by Bollywood choreographer Ganesh Acharya, which was a box office failure. This was followed by a TK Rajeev Kumar directed comedy, Chal Chala Chal. Govinda's performance was praised, and the film was successful. That year Salman Khan invited Dhawan and Govinda on his show, 10 Ka Dum, to celebrate the success of Partner.

The following year, he played a lawyer in the hit, Life Partner, and his performance was praised by the critics. Govinda rejoined Dhawan and Vashu Bhagnani for Do Knot Disturb; despite good reviews from critics, it was unsuccessful at the box office.

2010–present 
In 2010, Govinda appeared in Mani Ratnam's bilingual project, Raavan, with Abhishek Bachchan and Aishwarya Rai. He played a Forest Ministry employee who takes Vikram's character through the woods in search of a wanted criminal. Govinda denied reports that his character was a contemporary version of Hanuman, and his performance in the minor role was praised.

In 2011, he appeared in Jagmohan Mundhra's adult comedy, Naughty @ 40. Although the film received negative reviews, Govinda's performance was appreciated. He also appeared in Rajnish Thakur's comedy, Loot, and voiced Bajrangi the monkey for Nikhil Advani's animated Delhi Safari.

In 2013, Govinda co-starred with Priyanka Chopra in K. C. Bokadia's box office failure, Deewana Main Deewana, which had been made about ten years earlier. The film, a Hindi remake of the Tamil film Priyamudan, was directed by Vincent Selva; Govinda's performance as a villain was praised. He made his Bengali debut as a deputy inspector general of police in Dipak Sanyal's Samadhi, co-starring Gracy Singh and Sayali Bhagat, another box office failure.

In 2014, Govinda appeared in A.R. Murugadoss's Holiday, starring Akshay Kumar and Sonakshi Sinha. This was the second collaboration of Govinda and Akshay Kumar after Bhagam Bhag.

Three years after his last starring role he starred in Yash Raj Film's Kill Dil, directed by Shaad Ali, with Ranveer Singh, Parineeti Chopra and Ali Zafar. Govinda last played an antagonist in 2000's Shikari. In the film posters, he posed with a gun. The trailer was released on 18 September 2014. The trailer was appreciated by Amitabh Bachchan.
 The film was released on 14 November 2014; although Kill Dil was not a commercial success, Govinda's performance was praised by critics.

He played a superstar in Happy Ending with Saif Ali Khan and Ileana D'Cruz, his first appearance with Khan. Its trailer was released on 9 October 2014. The film was released on 21 November 2014; it was a box office failure, but Govinda's performance was praised.

In 2015 Govinda appeared in Hey Bro, starring Nupur Sharma and Ganesh Acharya.

In 2017, Govinda was seen as a cop in his home production Aa Gaya Hero, which was directed by Deepankar Senapati. The film also stars former Miss World Richa Sharma, Ashutosh Rana, Murali Sharma, Makarand Deshpande and Harish Kumar. Aa Gaya Hero will be Govinda's third home production, after Hatya and Ssukh. It was released on 17 March 2017. The film was not successful at the box office. He later starred alongside Varun Sharma in FryDay in 2018. His last theatrical release was Rangeela Raja in which he played a dual role in 2019 and was critically panned as "worst film".

He appeared as Judge in Zee Banglas Dance Bangla Dance in its Grand Finale in 2016 and 2018.

From 22 May he has appear again as Judge for all episodes in Zee Banglas Dance Bangla Dance

Personal life 
His brother, Kirti Kumar, is an actor, producer, director and singer. His sister, Kaamini Khanna, is a writer, music director, and singer. Govinda's uncle Anand Singh (assistant to director Hrishikesh Mukherjee), introduced him in Tan-Badan. Singh's sister-in-law, Sunita Munjal, fell in love with Govinda at this time, and they were married on 11 March 1987, with their marriage remaining a secret for four years. They have two children: daughter Tina Ahuja and son Yashvardhan. Tina made her Bollywood debut in the 2015 Second Hand Husband.

Govinda has six nephews and two nieces in the entertainment industry: actors Vinay Anand, Krishna Abhishek, Aryan, Arjun Singh, Ragini Khanna, Amit Khanna, Aarti Singh and director Janmendra Kumar Ahuja (alias Dumpy). Govinda's brother-in-law, Devendra Sharma, has appeared in several Hindi films.

Govinda was seriously injured on 5 January 1994 while travelling to a studio for the shooting of Khuddar. The actor's car collided with another car, and he sustained head injuries. Although he was bleeding profusely, Govinda did not cancel the shoot; after seeing a doctor, he worked until midnight.

Political career 
In 2004, Govinda joined the Congress Party and was elected to the Lok Sabha (the lower house of the Indian parliament) from Mumbai by 50,000 votes over the five-term incumbent.

During the elections, he said his agenda would be prawaas (transportation), swasthya (health) and gyaan (education). In the field of transportation, he claimed 80% credit for the quadrupling of the Borivali-Virar section of the Western Railway zone. According to official sources, he made some efforts in the fields of health and education. The Thane district collector said in an interview that Govinda had committed money from his "local area development fund" (allocated to each MP by the government) to construct anganwadis and solve drinking-water problems in Vasai and Virar but administrative approval was delayed.

Resignation 
Govinda's film-star status could explain his inaccessibility to his constituents, but not his absence from parliament. During his tenure as the Member of Parliament, Govinda was usually absent when the Lok Sabha was in session and he was severely criticized for inactivity. At the same time, he continued his film career while he was serving as an MP. Indeed, his career witnessed a comeback of sorts in 2007, after the release of Partner. He was pilloried in the press for the combination of continuing to act in films while being generally absent from parliament, and inaccessible to his constituents. On 20 January 2008, Govinda decided to leave politics and concentrate on his Bollywood acting career.

Later Govinda said that he wasted his time by joining politics and it badly affected his films.

Controversy 
In January 2008, Govinda slapped a struggling actor, Santosh Rai, on the set of Money Hai Toh Honey Hai at Filmistan Studio in Mumbai. On 5 February 2009, Rai filed a complaint against Govinda, accusing him of assault and crime, in the Borivali Magistrate Court. In 2013, the court ruled against Rai. In 2014, Rai took his case to the Supreme Court, saying that he had come to Mumbai to become an actor, and felt very humiliated when he was slapped by Govinda. According to Rai, he had contested the case for six years and had spent ₹500,000–600,000 on attorney fees. Since the actor did not apologise, he was more determined to fight him in court. In December 2015, the Supreme Court asked Govinda to apologise to Rai for slapping him and settle the whole matter out of the court immediately in the span of two weeks. The actor said that he "respects" the court's decision, and will decide when he receives it in writing.

Music career and collaborations 
Govinda has worked with music directors Anand Milind and Anand Raj Anand and playback singer Udit Narayan. Narayan has sung more than 100 songs for Govinda in more than 50 films, the greatest number of films and songs he has sung for a particular actor. Other singers associated with Govinda include Kishore Kumar, Amit Kumar, Kumar Sanu, Vinod Rathod, Abhijeet Bhattacharya and Sonu Nigam. Also, his elder brother Kirti Kumar has sung 2 songs for him. In the film Farz Ki Jung (1989) there was a popular song "Phool Ka Shabab Kya, Husn Mahatab Kya..." which was sung by Late Mohammed Rafi picturized on Govinda.

His first album, Govinda, was released in 1998. In November 2013 Govinda released his second album, Gori Tere Naina, with actress Pooja Bose. Govinda also wrote lyrics. He is lyricist of "I Love You bol daal" song in Haseena Maan Jaayegi(1999).

Filmography

Awards and nominations 
 

In 1999, Govinda was voted the world's tenth-greatest star of stage or screen in a BBC News Online poll. In July 2016, he was recognised as Actor of the Decade at the India Leadership Conclave in Mumbai.

Govinda has received 12 Filmfare Award nominations and 4 Zee Cine Awards. He has also received a Filmfare Awards for Best Performance in a Comic Role for Haseena Maan Jayegi (1999) and a Filmfare Special Award for Saajan Chale Sasural (1996).

References

External links 

 
 
 Govinda at Instagram

1963 births
Living people
20th-century Indian male actors
21st-century Indian male actors
Indian actor-politicians
Indian male comedians
Indian National Congress politicians
Indian television presenters
India MPs 2004–2009
Lok Sabha members from Maharashtra
Male actors from Mumbai
Male actors in Hindi cinema
Politicians from Mumbai
Punjabi people
Sindhi people
Filmfare Awards winners
Zee Cine Awards winners